South Fremont High School is a four-year public secondary school in St. Anthony, Idaho, United States. It is one of two high schools in the Fremont School District #215. The school colors are red and black and the mascot is a cougar. They are classified as a 3A school. The school excels in many programs, including athletics and music.

Controversies
In 1992, the school caught the attention of the American Civil Liberties Union for displaying a nativity scene in a school hallway. The scene contained two-inch tall figures which were arranged by the school's student council. The ACLU argued that the display was a violation of the First Amendment to the United States Constitution, which guarantees separation of church and state.

The school also received criticism in 1998 for holding its graduation ceremonies at Ricks College, which is run by the Church of Jesus Christ of Latter-day Saints. A school board member claimed that the ceremony would be uncomfortable for students who were not Mormons. The ACLU had fought with the school district in the 1980s to move its high school graduation from a LDS church building to a public school.

Athletics
South Fremont competes in athletics in IHSAA Class 3A, and is a member of the Mountain Rivers Conference. Other schools in this conference include rival Sugar-Salem High School and Teton High School.

The school’s sports teams include football, volleyball, soccer, basketball, wrestling, baseball, softball, speed golf, and track and field.

State titles
 Wrestling (1):  1985 
Baseball: 1991 A-2, now 3A;  3A 2004

Boys Basketball: 2014-15 State 3A Boys Basketball Champions

Notable alumni
 Jason Buck, former NFL defensive lineman for Cincinnati Bengals and Washington Redskins, first-round 17th overall pick in 1987 NFL Draft by Cincinnati Bengals, winner of Outland Trophy in 1986 at BYU.
 Brandon Bair, defensive lineman for the Oregon Ducks, Kansas City Chiefs, Oakland Raiders, and Philadelphia Eagles.

References

External links

Fremont School District #215

Public high schools in Idaho
Schools in Fremont County, Idaho